This article contains information about the literary events and publications of 1560.

Events
August 27 – The Parliament of Scotland approves the Scots Confession of faith.
unknown date – Paolo Veronese completes his work on the interior decoration of the Biblioteca Marciana in Venice.

New books

Prose
Geneva Bible (first full edition)
Giachem Bifrun (translator) – L'g Nuof Sainc Testamaint da nos Signer Jesu Christ (New Testament in Putèr variety of Romansh language)s
Thomas Churchyard – The Contention  Churchyeard and Camell, upon David Dycers Dreame
Scots Confession, officially The Confession of Faith of the Kirk of Scotland, etc.

Drama
Jacques Grévin – Jules César
Thomas Preston – Cambises (possible date of first performance)

Poetry
See 1560 in poetry

Births
January 5 – John Bois, English Bible translator (died 1643)
Baptised August 4 – Sir John Harington, English courtier, poet and inventor (died 1612)
October 10 – Jacobus Arminius, Dutch theologian (died 1609)
December 3 – Jan Gruter, Netherlandish critic and scholar (died 1627)
Unknown dates 
Constantino Cajetan, Italian ecclesiastical historian (died 1650)
Álvarez de Paz, Spanish Jesuit theologian (died 1620)
Mark Ridley, English lexicographer of Russian and physician (died in or before 1624)
probable
Heinrich Khunrath, German hermetic philosopher writing in Latin (died 1605)
Anthony Munday, English dramatist and miscellanist (died 1633)

Deaths
January 1 – Joachim du Bellay, French poet (born c. 1522)
April 7 – Robert Céneau, French bishop and historian (born 1483)
April 19 – Philipp Melanchthon, German Protestant theologian (born 1497)
July 9 – John Slotanus, Dutch Catholic polemical writer (date of birth unknown)
September 30 – Melchior Cano, Spanish theologian (born c. 1509)
November 15 – Domingo de Soto, Spanish theologian (born 1494)
December 21 – Georg Thym, German poet (born c. 1520)
Unknown date – Didacus Ximenes, Spanish theologian and philosopher

References

Years of the 16th century in literature